King's Highway 35, commonly referred to as Highway 35, is a provincially maintained highway in the Canadian province of Ontario, linking Highway 401 with the Kawartha Lakes, Haliburton, and Algonquin Provincial Park. The highway travels from west of Newcastle, through Lindsay, near Fenelon Falls, Coboconk, Minden Hills, and into Haliburton before terminating at Highway 60 to the west of Algonquin Park. Within those areas, it services the communities of Orono, Cameron, Rosedale, Norland, Moore Falls, Miners Bay, Lutterworth, Carnarvon, Buttermilk Falls, Halls Lake, Pine Springs and Dorset. The winding course of the road, combined with the picturesque views offered along its length, have led some to declare it the most scenic highway in Ontario.

Most of the route, including a portion of Highway60, was assumed by the Department of Highways (DHO), predecessor to the Ministry of Transportation (MTO) by 1940. In the mid-1950s, several bypasses were constructed to divert Highway 35 away from town centres including Lindsay, Fenelon Falls and Minden. This portion was widened to a divided expressway in the late eighties. Studies are considering whether to widen the route between Enterprise Hill and Lindsay to four lanes, including reconstructing the trumpet interchange at the former. Expansion of part of the Lindsay bypass to four lanes is scheduled to begin in 2023.

Highway 35 is patrolled along its entirety by the Ontario Provincial Police.

Route description

Newcastle–Coboconk 
For the length of this concurrency, which is located entirely within the municipality of Clarington in the Regional Municipality of Durham, it is a divided four lane route with no left turns, known as right-in/right-out (RIRO).
It begins in a northeasterly direction, with an interchange at former Highway 2 (now Durham Regional Highway 2) prior to curving north. Several businesses, including gas stations and fast food franchises, line the next portion of the highway interspersed among farmland. After swerving to the east of Orono, Highway35/115 meets the eastern terminus of Highway407 East.
It enters the Oak Ridges Moraine and passes through the eastern edge of the Ganaraska Forest at Enterprise Hill.
Highway35 exits the divided highway—which continues as Highway115 east to Peterborough—at a trumpet interchange known as the 35/115 split, and proceeds north as a two lane road.

Highway35 crosses into the city of Kawartha Lakes, a mostly rural single-tier municipality,
at Boundary Road (Durham/Kawartha Lakes Road 20), which provides access to the nearby Canadian Tire Motorsport Park.
The highway travels north in a straight line, passing to the east of Pontypool before exiting the Oak Ridges Moraine near Ballyduff Road.
It intersects the eastern leg of Highway 7A, then curves northeast briefly before encountering the western leg. The headwaters of the Pigeon River lie nearby, the river itself being crossed just south of Janetville Road (Kawartha Lakes Road57).
The terrain flattens approaching Lindsay,
where the route intersects Highway 7, onto which it turns west and becomes concurrent. Highway7/35 bypass Lindsay to the southwest, after which Highway35 branches east onto Kent Street, then north, while Highway7 continues west.

North of Lindsay, Highway35 travels near the Trent–Severn Waterway, tracing its route alongside Sturgeon Lake, Cameron Lake and Balsam Lake.
It passes over the first of several limestone cuestas near the Ken Reid Conservation Area as it approaches the boundary between the Ordovician limestone and the Precambrian Canadian Shield.
The route curves northeast and travels through farmland as well as the community of Cameron, before turning back northward at Powles Corners, where it intersects the southern end of former Highway 121 (now Kawartha Lakes Road121).
It continues north a short distance to intersect Kawartha Lakes Road 8, the eastern leg formerly being Highway35A into Fenelon Falls.
The highway curves around the southern end of Cameron Lake near Isaacs Glen, travels north for a brief period then zig-zags northeast through Rosedale,
where it crosses the Trent–Severn on the Constable Randall F. Skidmore Bridge, named after a local police officer who was involved in a fatal crash nearby on February14, 1986.
The farmland alongside the highway thins out north of Rosedale, as the route makes its approach to Coboconk.

Coboconk–Dwight 

Approaching the village of Coboconk, Highway35 descends a second cuesta to the Gull River valley. It crosses the river and intersects the former northeastern terminus of Highway 48.
North of the village, the route makes its final descent from the flat limestone plateau into the rocky Canadian Shield. The topography quickly shifts from grassland and deciduous forest to granite outcroppings and Boreal forest as the highway winds along the west side of Silver and Shadow lakes. In Norland, the route intersects former Highway 503 (now Kawartha Lakes Road45). It begins to follow alongside the Gull River—which it continues to cross and parallel for the remainder of its length—as it curves northeast into Haliburton County.
Highway35 travels along the eastern edge of the Queen Elizabeth II Wildlands Provincial Park as it curves around Moore and Gull Lake, passing through the communities of Moore Falls and Miners Bay. Several passing lanes and a short stretch of four lane highway exist in this segment.
It reaches the town of Minden where it meets former Highway121 again and provides access to the Minden Wild Water Preserve.

Highway 35 generally follows the former Bobcaygeon Colonization Road north of Minden, though several realignments over the years have led to its current winding route.
At Carnarvon, it meets with Highway 118. The route then follows the east side of Boshkung Lake, passes through Buttermilk Falls, travels long the west side of Halls Lake, then arches northwest to cross the midpoint of Kushog Lake.
Heading northward into increasingly mountainous terrain, the highway crosses into Muskoka near Dorset, and shortly thereafter reaches its terminus at Highway 60 west of Algonquin Park.

Traffic 
Traffic volumes on Highway 35 vary considerably over the length of the highway, as well as over the course of the year due to its use for recreational purposes, including snowmobiling, cottaging and camping. Along the Highway35/115 concurrency, the average daily vehicle count is above 20,000. This drops as Highway35 splits off at Enterprise Hill to under 10,000vehicles per day. That volume is fairly consistent as far north as Minden, at which point the vehicle count drops below 5,000 and tapers off as low as 2,000 at Highway60.

Highway 35 is patrolled along its entirety by the Ontario Provincial Police.

History 

Highway 35, like many highways that begin at Lake Ontario and eventually cross into the Canadian Shield, began as several trails connecting settlements. Most of the southern portion of the highway follows various sidelines and concessions.
Between Lindsay and Fenelon Falls, Highway 35 follows the former Fenelon Road, while north of there it follows The Cameron Road, a trail carved in the 1850s between Fenelon and Minden. North of Minden, the highway roughy follows The Bobcaygeon Road, a colonization road built as far north as Dwight in the 1850s.

Predecessors and construction 
Several portions of Highway35 were built along or nearby the Bobcaygeon Road, a colonization road built in the 1850s to open settlement into the frontier of Central Ontario. The first half of the 19th century saw settlement occur along "the front", the townships established along the shores of Lake Ontario. Seeking to open the interior lands of Upper Canada to prospective settlers and farming, the government began the construction of the colonization roads through the wilderness of the southern edge of the Canadian Shield. In 1854, Michael Deane surveyed a line between present-day Bobcaygeon and Carnarvon. Actual construction of a passable road along the survey line began on October 16, 1856. It was named by Peterborough County sheriff William Conger, whom had promoted the building of the road for several years.

Five miles (8km) of the Bobcaygeon Road were opened by the end of 1856. By the end of 1858, it was opened to north of the Burnt River in Kinmount, and by 1860 to the Gull River, where the townsite of Minden was established. The road was opened farther north to the Peterson Road at Carnarvon in the summer of 1861, and to Dorset by the end of 1862.
Maintenance of the road was accomplished through statute labour, which was unable to keep up with the degradation caused by the elements. Despite its poor condition, the Bobcaygeon Road stayed in use until the future route of Highway35 was built in the 1930s.

At the height of the Great Depression, work began in late 1931 between Coboconk and Dorset to build a new road.
The relief project employed upwards of 2,300men, who resided in at least 13temporary work camps. Work was done by hand in many places, with only dynamite and horses to aid construction along the rocky shorelines of lakes.
Construction wrapped up by the end of 1936, the final year before the jurisdiction of the DHO was extended north of the Trent–Severn Waterway.

Designation and paving 
The Highway 35 designation was first applied in 1931 to the road between Lindsay and Fenelon Falls. The  assumed the Cameron Road through the townships of Ops and Fenelon on July1 of that year.
On April1, 1937, the Department of Northern Development merged into the ,. As a result, an additional  of road were added to the length of Highway35. The portion south of Coboconk within Victoria County was assumed by the department on August11 of that year, while the remainder within the county from Coboconk to north of Norland was assumed several weeks later on September1. The portion lying within Haliburton County, from north of Norland to Dwight and Huntsville, was assumed a month later on October6.

At this point, much of the assumed route was a gravel road. Only the section south of Orono and from Lindsay to Cameron was paved.
Construction quickly began to pave the gravel sections of the route. Approximately  of paving between Cameron and Fenelon Falls was completed in 1938.
By 1939, the concurrency of Highway35/60 between Huntsville and Dwight was also paved.
Approximately  of paving north of Carnarvon to Wren Lake was completed in 1942.
The remaining  of gravel road between Wren Lake and Birkendale was paved in 1945.
A permanent pavement was laid from north of Norland to Dwight, as well as between Fenelon Falls and Rosedale in 1947.
Paving was completed between Rosedale and Coboconk in 1950,
and on the remaining gap between Coboconk and the Victoria–Haliburton county boundary in 1953.
It would take until 1958 for paving to commence south of Lindsay.

In 1953, Highway 115 was built as a two lane road eastward from Highway 35 near Pontypool. It was completed to Peterborough by 1954,
and co-designated with Highway 35 southwards in 1961.
Construction began to widen both to four lanes beginning in 1984,
which was completed in the late 1980s and early 1990s.
The concurrency with Highway 60 was removed from Highway 35 after 1961,
but before 1969.

Beginning in 1954, several bypasses were constructed around the towns and villages along the route.
The first of these was in Minden, bypassing the old route along the Bobcaygeon Road and South Water Street.
This was followed by the bypassing of Fenelon Falls in 1955. Highway 35 followed present day Kawartha Lakes Road 121 and Kawartha Lakes Road 8 into and out of the village until the Seventh Concession Line was paved and the highway rerouted onto it.
In 1956, Newcastle and Orono were bypassed and Highway35 connected directly to the then eastern terminus of Highway401 west of the village. The former route is now Durham Regional Road 19.
Work also began that year to rebuild the highway north to Lindsay, as well as on the Lindsay Bypass.
Prior to the opening of the bypass, Highway35 followed Lindsay Street to Kent Street and jogged northwest along William Street and Colborne Street. It then followed today's Kawartha Lakes Road 4 north and west to the current intersection with Highway35.
This routing became Highway35B when the bypass opened on October10, 1958.
In the 1960s, the route through Pontypool (now known as John Street) was bypassed.

Prior to 2007, the highway was extensively rehabilitated between Kawartha Lakes Road 121, near Fenelon Falls and Highway 118 in Carnarvon. This included widening the highway for a third passing lane, as well as the resurfacing of several sections.

On the day before Remembrance Day, 2009, the section of Highway 35 between Lindsay and Norland was renamed the Midland Regiment Commemorative Highway, in honour of veterans of World War II. Signs are placed along the highway at regular intervals to acknowledge the designation.
On April 25, 2012, four bridges along the highway were renamed in memory of police officers killed in the line of duty: The Constable Randall F. Skidmore Bridge over the Trent–Severn Waterway in Rosedale; the Constable Eric Nystedt Bridge over the Gull River in Moore Falls; and the Corporal James Smith Bridge and Detective Sergeant Lorne J. Chapitis Bridge between Miners Bay and Minden.

Future 
The MTO is currently performing an environmental assessment on Highway 35 between the Highway 115 split and Lindsay, in preparation for a four-lane expansion.
In 2009, the provincial government of Dalton McGuinty promised to widen Highway7/35 near Lindsay.
Work began later that year to widen the bridge over the Scugog River to accommodate a four lane cross section.
A detailed design report was submitted in late 2021 to move forward with the widening, which is scheduled to begin in 2023.

Major intersections

Suffixed routes

Highway 35A 

The old route, between Powles Corners and Fenelon Falls, became part of the new Highway 121 at that time, while the remainder travelling east out of Fenelon Falls was renumbered as Highway35A.
The short  route remained in the provincial highway system until April1, 1997, when it was transferred to Victoria County.

Highway 35B (Lindsay) 

Highway35B, which was concurrent for its entire length with Highway 7B, travelled through Lindsay, following Kent Street West and Lindsay Street South, connecting with Highway35 at both ends. It was created when the Lindsay Bypass was opened on October10, 1958, redirecting the combined Highway7/35 southwest of the town.
Initially, Highway35B followed Lindsay Street to Kent Street, then jogged northwest along Kent Street, William Street and Colborne Street.
However, on September21, 1968, the  portion north of Kent Street was transferred to Victoria County;
Highway35B was consequently rerouted along Kent Street.
The remaining  of the route was decommissioned on April1, 1997, and transferred to Victoria County.

Highway 35B (Dorset)

References
Sources

Bibliography

External links

 Highway 35 Planning Study official website (archived September 29, 2007)
 Map of the study area (archived September 29, 2007)
 Highway 35 at OntHighways.com
 Highway 35 and the issue of "Scope Creep"

035
Kawartha Lakes
Transport in Clarington